This is a list of the 325 members of the 10th legislature of the Italian Senate that were elected in the 1987 general election. The legislature met from 2 July 1987 to 22 April 1992.

Senators for life are marked with a "(L)"

Christian Democracy

Italian Communist Party

Italian Socialist Party

Independent Left

Italian Social Movement

Communist Refoundation Party
Lucio Libertini
Stojan Spetic
Giuseppe Vitale
Armando Cossutta
Salvatore Crocetta
Angelo Dionisi
Luigi Meriggi
Ersilia Salvato
Rino Serri
Girolamo Tripodi
Paolo Volponi

Italian Republican Party
Libero Gualtieri
Giorgio Covi
Giuseppe Dipaola
Susanna Agnelli
Rocco Coletta
Giovanni Ferrara
Giuseppe Perricone
Giovanni Spadolini (L)
Leo Valiani (L)
Bruno Visentini

Italian Democratic Socialist Party
Antonio Cariglia
Vincenza Bono Parrino
Gianpaolo Bissi 
Maurizio Pagani 
Costantino Dell'Osso 
Luigi Franza
Giuseppe Saragat (L)

Federalista Europeo Ecologista
Gianfranco Spadaccia 
Franco Corleone
Marco Boato
Gianfranco Mariotti
Piero Craveri
Lorenzo Strik Lievers
Domenico Modugno
Giuseppe Lelio Petronio
Massimo Teodori

Mixed group
Roland Riz
Cesare Dujany
Carlo Sanna
Giovanni Agnelli (L)
Umberto Bossi
Francesco Candioto
Giuseppe Fassino
Giovanni Leone (L)
Giovanni Malagodi
Pietro Fiocchi
Cesare Merzagora (L)
Guido Pollice
Hans Rubner
Piergiorgio Sirtori

References

list
Lists of political office-holders in Italy
Lists of legislators by term
Lists of members of upper houses